The women's slopestyle competition of the Sochi 2014 Olympics was held at Rosa Khutor Extreme Park on 6 February (qualification) and 9 February (semi-finals and final). This was the first time that a slopestyle event was included in the Olympic program.

Jamie Anderson of the United States became the first Olympic champion. Enni Rukajärvi from Finland took the silver, and Jenny Jones from Great Britain won the bronze medal.

Qualification

An athlete must have placed in the top 30 in at a World Cup event after July 2012 or at the 2013 World Championships and a minimum of 50 FIS points. A total of 24 quota spots are available to athletes to compete at the games. A maximum of 4 athletes can be entered by a National Olympic Committee.

Slovenia's Cilka Sadar also earned a spot to compete, but did not compete due to an injury occurring just days before the competition, leaving a total of 23 athletes from 11 nations.

Schedule
All times are (UTC+4).

Results

Qualification
The top four riders from each heat automatically qualify for the final round. The remaining riders qualify for the semi-final round. The result is calculated as the best score of the two runs. The following were the results of the qualification round:

 QF – Qualified directly for the Final
 QS – Qualified for the Semi-final
 Bib – Bib number
 DNS – Did Not Start
 Tie – Tie breaking points

Semi-final
The top four riders from the semi-final round qualify for the final round. The result is calculated as the best score of the two runs.

Final
In the final, Šárka Pančochová, who did not qualify directly to the final and had to go through the semi-final, posted the best result in the first run, but fell in the second run and was classified fifth. In the second run, first Jones, who also went through the semi-final, scored 87.25, followed by Sina Candrian with 87.00. Rukajärvi, running fifth, scored 92.50, and pushed Pančochová out of medal position. Anderson scored 95.25 and took the lead with two more athletes to go, Isabel Derungs and Anna Gasser. They both fell and were left out of the medals.

References

External links
2014 Winter Olympics results: Women's Slopestyle

Women's snowboarding at the 2014 Winter Olympics